Blanche Capel is an American biologist and James B. Duke Professor of Cell Biology at Duke University. Her research focuses on vertebrate sex determination.

Education 
After graduating with a BA in Literature and Art History from Hollins College, Capel married and focused on raising her children. She became interested in further study by the time her children reached school age and took various undergraduate classes at Haverford and Bryn Mawr College.  Following two years in Haverford's molecular biology program, she started to work towards a PhD in genetics at the laboratory of Beatrice Mintz at the Fox Chase Cancer Center. She was awarded her PhD by the University of Pennsylvania in 1989.

Career 
Capel's first academic position was as a postdoc at the National Institute for Medical Research in the lab of Robin Lovell-Badge. She left for an assistant professorship at Duke University in 1993 and was made full professor in 2005.

She has been an editor of a range of journals related to her research, such as Science and Developmental Biology. She was president of the publisher of Developmental Biology, the Society for Developmental Biology, in 2017.

The American Association for the Advancement of Science elected her fellow in 2010, the American Academy of Arts and Sciences followed suit in 2020.

References

External links 
 Blanche Capel on the website of the Duke University School of Medicine

Hollins University alumni
Haverford College alumni
University of Pennsylvania alumni
American biologists
Women biologists
Duke University faculty
Fellows of the American Association for the Advancement of Science
Fellows of the American Academy of Arts and Sciences
Year of birth missing (living people)
Living people